Dačov Lom is a village and municipality in the Veľký Krtíš District of the Banská Bystrica Region of southern Slovakia.

History
It arose in 1943 with the union of Dolný (first mention in 1511 Lam Inferior) and Horný Dačov Lom (first mention in 1333 Lom). In 1333, Horný Dačov Lom belonged to nobles Dobáky, in 1337 to local feudatories Dacsóy and in the 18th century to Maitheény, Balassa and Zichy.

Genealogical resources
The records for genealogical research are available at the state archive "Statny Archiv in Banska Bystrica, Slovakia"

 Roman Catholic church records (births/marriages/deaths): 1792-1890 (parish B)
 Lutheran church records (births/marriages/deaths): 1731-1896 (parish A)

See also
 List of municipalities and towns in Slovakia

References

External links
 
 
http://www.e-obce.sk/obec/dacovlom/dacov-lom.html
Surnames of living people in Dacov Lom

Villages and municipalities in Veľký Krtíš District